Skydance Media, LLC (formerly known as Skydance Productions) is an American production company based in Santa Monica, California. Founded by David Ellison in 2006, the company entered a five-year partnership to co-produce and co-finance films with Paramount Pictures starting in 2009, and renewed the agreement twice extending to 2021. The company specializes in films, animation, television, video games, and sports.

History

Skydance Productions was formed in 2006 by David Ellison. The firm's first film was Flyboys in 2006; it starred Ellison and was co-financed with Metro-Goldwyn-Mayer.

In the fall of 2009, Skydance and Paramount Pictures signed a five-year co-financing, production and distribution agreement, with Paramount holding an additional option of distribution. Before August 2010, Skydance hired Dana Goldberg, formerly of Village Roadshow Pictures, to oversee development and production. In August 2010, with the Paramount partnership and an equity investment by Ellison's father and Oracle Corporation co-founder and chairman Larry Ellison, who was then the sixth richest person in the world, Skydance raised $350 million in equity and credit to co-finance its films. On October 25, 2011, Skydance tried to sign its own first production client with Alex Kurtzman and Roberto Orci of K/O Paper Products, but the deal never materialized.

On May 1, 2013, Skydance launched Skydance Television hiring Marcy Ross as division president. In 2014, Jesse Sisgold joined Skydance as President of Business Affairs & Strategic Planning and later that year was upped to Chief Operating Officer. Again he was promoted in 2017 to President & COO. In March 2014, Don Granger joined the company as the EVP of Feature Productions, a newly created position; he reports to Dana Goldberg who is the company's chief creative officer. In March 2015, Anne Globe joined the company as chief marketing officer. Later in the same year, Skydance raised $700 million in new financing. The refinancing included $200 million in equity from a group of investors, and a $500 million line of credit from J.P. Morgan Chase. Skydance renewed its slate deal with Paramount in the summer of 2013 for four more years.

On May 3, 2016, Skydance launched the Skydance Interactive division last year following the acquisition of The Workshop Entertainment and announced in January 2017 for a new VR story-driven game titled Archangel. Skydance also created a production label named Uncharted in December 2016 to house content which falls outside of the action, sci-fi, or fantasy genres. On March 16, 2017, Skydance launched the Skydance Animation division by forming a multi-year partnership with Madrid-based Ilion Animation Studios. In August 2017, Skydance and Paramount renewed their slate deal for another four years to 2021, with the addition of Skydance's animated films for distribution. On January 25, 2018, Tencent bought a 5% to 10% minority stake. Jun Oh was hired by Skydance Media as head of theatrical, interactive and legal affairs in October 2018. In February 2020, RedBird Capital Partners and CJ ENM invested in the company.

On October 20, 2021, Skydance tapped veteran producer Jon Weinbach to lead a new sports division called Skydance Sports, a new unit will develop scripted and unscripted sports-related content. In January 2022, Skydance formed a multi-year feature film deal with Apple TV+, ending its deal with Paramount. However, Skydance continued working with Paramount on franchises including Mission: Impossible, Star Trek, Top Gun, Terminator, Jack Ryan, and Transformers. On October 13, 2022, Skydance completed a $400 million strategic investment round which was led by KKR, a first-time investor, and joined by the Ellison family who are majority shareholders.

Films

Released

Upcoming

In development

Skydance Television

Skydance Television is a television production company launched by Skydance on May 1, 2013. The division hired Marcy Ross as division president and a month later, Carolyn Harris joined Skydance Television as vice president. However, in January 2020, Ross left her position transitioning to  a deal with the media company, where she continues to be an executive producer on Grace and Frankie, Altered Carbon, Condor and Foundation. Bill Bost was promo edfrom senior vice president to president of Skydance Television. In November 2022, Bost stepped down and launched his own company; Netflix's Matt Thunell took his place.

In May 2014, Jake Rose joined Skydance Television as EVP Production and in March 2018, Carol Turner joined Skydance replacing Rose and overseeing production on site at the studio. By July 2014 its first show, Manhattan, was launched on WGN America; it received critical acclaim throughout its run, but failed to secure adequate ratings, resulting in the series being canceled for 2 seasons in 2015.

Later in April 2017, director Sam Raimi signed his first look deal at Skydance Television with his television producing partner Debbie Liebling. By September 2017, a multi-year overall agreement was signed by producers Patrick Massett and John Zinman after they joined a series which was based on Sword Art Online. After the 2017 announcement of developing a series adaptation of Isaac Asimov's science fiction book series Foundation with David S. Goyer and Josh Friedman serving as the production's writers. In 2018, Apple Studios bought the rights to the series renewing it for a second season upon its release in 2021, making it the first Skydance series from Apple Inc. to air. In June 2018, Dietland aired on AMC  along with a companion talk show hosted by Aisha Tyler from Archer, under its label company Uncharted.

In September 2019, writer David S. Goyer also signed an deal with Skydance Television for an exclusive multi-year overall agreement as well under his Phantom Four company. In April 2019, Daredevil writer Lewaa Nasserdeen joined Skydance Television in an overall deal as well while developing a semi-autobiographical comedy-drama series on Showtime. In May 2019 Alison Schapker, showrunner of Altered Carbon, made an overall deal with Skydance Television to develop series at the studio, including an US remake of a South Korea series called Hotel del Luna. 
By August 2019, writer Olivia Purnell had signed an overall deal with Skydance Television writing projects for the studio. In May 2020, Nick Santora  also got an overall deal with Skydance Television with a series starting Arnold Schwarzenegger called FUBAR, soon to be released on Netflix. In May 2020 Skydance Television named Drew Brown as head of production.

In December 2020, Skydance Television signed a first look deal with Exile Content Studio to develop and produce scripted series. By February 2021, the studio also signed a first look deal with Impact, a global talent network and development accelerator program owned by Ron Howard and Brian Grazer for television productions. In November 2021, Peter Johnson joins Skydance Television as a television executive reporting for Bill Bost. By December 2022, it was announced that Octavia Spencer’s production company, Orit Entertainment, has entered a multiyear first-look deal for scripted projects for Skydance Television.

Television series

Released

Upcoming

Scrapped projects

Skydance Interactive

Skydance Interactive (formerally known as The Workshop Entertainment) is a game division which was launched on May 5, 2016. It focuses on developing ambitious titles, managing projects licenses with other developers, and developing software innovative game mechanics as well as for VR and emerging platforms.

In May 2017, Chris Hewish was hired as EVP Interactive help to set and execute overall strategy for Skydance Interactive, and oversee development, partnerships, and new business opportunities.
On July 18, 2017, its first VR game, Archangel was launched. The game recently expanded into an online multiplayer upgrade, Archangel: Hellfire. Two days later, Skydance Interactive revealed their second original game called PWND, an multiplayer free to play game released on April 6, 2018, where players uses Pwns to win.

In 2018, Skydance Interactive partnered with Skybound Entertainment to develop a number of original virtual reality video games based on the expansive world of The Walking Dead universe. The Walking Dead: Saints & Sinners and The Walking Dead: Saints & Sinners - Chapter 2: Retribution were to be the inaugural titles co-developed by the two companies.

Games

Released

Upcoming

Skydance Animation

Skydance Animation is the animation division of Skydance Media; it focuses on animated feature films and television series. It was founded on March 16, 2017. Its first film was Luck and its first short film was Blush.

Skydance New Media

Skydance New Media is a video game development studio founded by Skydance on November 18, 2019, led by Amy Hennig.

In October 2021, the studio announced a planned collaboration with Marvel Entertainment for an action-adventure game. In April 2022, it was announced that Lucasfilm Games would collaborate making a game based in the Star Wars universe. There has been speculation that the game will be a revival of Project Ragtag which was also led by Henning.

In August 2022, Marvel's parent corporation The Walt Disney Company announced their intentions to showcase a slate of video games based on their IP at the joint Disney & Marvel Games Showcase. It would happen in conjunction with the company's annual D23 Expo in person and through broadcasts on multiple streaming platforms. Along with the announcement, Disney said that the panel would also debut a "sneak peek" at Skydance New Media's Marvel title, which is described as being an "ensemble game". During the showcase on September 9, 2022, the Marvel project confirmed prior reports that it would be set during World War II. Also Captain America and Azzuri / Black Panther will be featured as the main characters in the ensemble, alongside Gabriel Jones of the Howling Commandos unit and Nanali, leader of the Wakandan Spy Network, while the Hydra organization would serve as the main villains.

Games

Skydance Sports

Skydance Sports is a sports content division launched by Skydance on October 20, 2021, led by Jon Weinbach.

In January 2022, Skydance Sports set up a partnership with Meadowlark Media to produce unscripted sports content. One of their projects is a soccer documentary series called Good Rivals, originally named Good Neighbors. It is a three-part series on Amazon Prime Video which began around the 2022 FIFA World Cup, which begins on November 24, 2022. The second project would follow Diana Taurasi's career; she is the most accomplished player in the history of women's basketball.

In March 2022, Religion of Sports signed with Skydance Sports to develop, finance, and produce a slate of sports-related shows for multiple platforms, starting with a series called The Owl. It is created and executive produced by Michael Perri and directed by Aurora Guerrero. In April 2022, Skydance Sports had their first film picked up at Amazon Studios. It is based on Nike Inc,; Ben Affleck and Matt Damon teamed up to rewrite the script and star in the film. Affleck will direct. On October 12, 2022, Kylian Mbappé and his production banner, Zebra Valley, signed a multiyear first-look deal with Skydance Sports.

On November 3, 2022, Skydance Sports teamed up with America's Cup for an "all-access, behind-the-scenes" documentary series about the next America's Cup race. It is helmed by original Free Solo team Elizabeth Chai Vasarhelyi and Jimmy Chin under the banner of their production company Little Monster Films. In the same month, the NFL announced a partnership creating the premier global multi-sports production studio in the industry with Skydance Sports.

References

External links
 

Skydance Media
Film production companies of the United States
Television production companies of the United States
Companies based in Santa Monica, California
Mass media companies established in 2006
American companies established in 2006
2006 establishments in California
Entertainment companies based in California